The Perfect Guy may refer to:

 The Perfect Guy (1998 film), a French musical
 The Perfect Guy (2015 film), an American thriller
 "The Perfect Guy" (Frasier), an episode of the American sitcom Frasier

See also 
 Perfect Man (disambiguation)
 Mr. Perfect (disambiguation)